Agatolimod (also known as CpG 7909, ODN 2006, PF-3512676, VaxImmune, and ProMuneT) is a CpG Oligodeoxynucleotide which acts as a toll-like receptor 9 agonist. Agatolimod stimulates the immune system and has been tested for prevention and treatment of cancer, infectious diseases, allergies, and asthma.

Sequence
Agatolimod is composed of 24 deoxyribonucleotides in the following sequence:

(T-C-G-T-C-G-T-T-T-T-G-T-C-G-T-T-T-T-G-T-C-G-T-T)

References

Toll-like receptors